Jensen Beach High School (JBHS) is a public high school in Jensen Beach, Florida.

History
JBHS opened in August 2004 with an enrollment of 1100 students in grades 9 through 11. A senior class was added the following year. It was an open choice school for several years but only accepted local students for some time. Starting in 2021 they made the change to become open choice again.

During the summer of 2013, the original principal, Ginger Featherstone, was promoted to the district position of Director of Secondary, Adult, and Community Vocational Programs. In the summer of 2015, the second principal, Greg Laws, retired citing personal health reasons.  The current principal is Lori Vogel.

Recognition
The school is accredited by the Southern Association of Colleges and Schools (SACS). It has been an "A" school for five straight years. Jensen Beach High School was graded a B for the 2010/2011 school year.  In 2009, Newsweek magazine ranked JBHS as one of the top schools in the nation (636 out of 1500). In 2010 and 2011 "Newsweek" magazine rated JBHS one of the top schools in the nation. In 2011, JBHS was the only one of the three Martin County high schools to be credited by "Newsweek" (Four including Clark Advanced Learning Center, which is a National Model High School). In 2009, the International Center for Leadership in Education recognized JBHS as one of the 40 top schools in the nation. Previous recognition includes the Florida Department of Education naming JBHS as one of the top-50 high schools in the state and being named a Positive Behavior Support (PBS) Model School (2007).

Activities
The music department was one of six schools in Florida to be named finalists in the 2010 "Grammy Foundation's Signature Schools Program."

Athletics
JBHS has earned several state championships:
 Boys' Wrestling: multiple state champions 
 Girls' Volleyball: 2007, 2009, 2012, 2015, 2022
 Girls' Basketball: 2007
 Boys' Tennis: 2016
 Boys' Soccer: 2006
 Girls' 4 × 800 Relay: 2006

Alumni
Jamien Sherwood*- Linebacker for the New York Jets

References

External links
Official School Website

High schools in Martin County, Florida
Martin County School District
Public high schools in Florida